William Walter Wondolowski (born November 29, 1946 in Jersey City, New Jersey) is a former professional American football wide receiver, who played in one game for the San Francisco 49ers in 1969.

External links
Pro-Football-Reference

1946 births
Bayonne High School alumni
Living people
Sportspeople from Bayonne, New Jersey
Players of American football from Jersey City, New Jersey
American football wide receivers
San Francisco 49ers players